The NCAA Men's Division III Cross Country Championship is an annual cross country meet to decide the team and individual national champions of men's NCAA Division III intercollegiate cross country running in the United States. It has been held every fall, usually in November, since the NCAA split into its current three-division format in 1973.

The current champions are MIT, who won their first national title in 2022.

Format  
The field for the national championship race varied in the early years, reaching a high of 52 teams in 1977. From 1982 to 1998 the field was fixed at 21 teams. From 1999 to 2005 the field included 24 teams. Beginning in 2006, the national championship race has included 32 teams. Teams compete in one of ten regional championships to qualify. In addition to the 32 teams, 70 individual runners qualify for the national championship.

The race distance from 1973 to 1975 was 5 miles (8,046 meters). Since 1976 the race distance has been 8,000 meters (4.97 miles).

Champions 

† indicates a then-NCAA record-setting time for that particular distance.

A time highlighted in ██ indicates the all-time NCAA championship record for that distance.

Source:

Team titles

 Source: 
 Note: Schools highlight in yellow have reclassified athletics from NCAA Division III.

See also
NCAA Men's Cross Country Championships (Division I, Division II)
NCAA Women's Cross Country Championships (Division I, Division II, Division III)
Pre-NCAA Cross Country Champions
NAIA Cross Country Championships (Men, Women)

References

External links
NCAA Division III Men's Cross Country
U.S. Track & Field and Cross Country Coaches Association - Year by Year Results

 Division III
Men's athletics competitions